This is a timeline of the development of prophecy among the Jews in Judaism. All dates are given according to the Common Era, not the Hebrew calendar.

See also Jewish history which includes links to individual country histories.

the Exodus
c.1450-1350 BC(?) the Exodus from Egypt (prophecy of Moses, Aaron, and Miriam)

the Land of Israel
c. 1300-1250 BC Joshua leads the people
c. 1250 BC–c. 1025 BC Biblical Judges lead the people. (prophecy of Deborah)

During the Kingdom of Israel and Judah
c. 1025 BC–c. 1003 BC King Saul, prophecy of Samuel, 
c. 1003 BC–c. 963 BC King David, prophecy of Nathan prophecy of Gad
c. 963 BC–c. 923 BC King Solomon
c. 923 BC–c. 913 BC King Rehoboam of Judah, prophecy of Shemaiah
c. 922 BC–c. 910 BC King Jeroboam of Israel, prophecy of Ahijah
c. 913 BC–c. 910 BC King Asa of Judah
prophecies of Elijah, Micaiah, and Elisha
c. 837 BC–c. 800 BC King Joash of Judah
prophecy of Jonah during the time of Babylonian captivity, though dating of the book ranges from the 6th to the late 3rd century BC.
c. 796 BC–c. 768 BC King Amaziah of Judah
prophecy of Amos, Hosea
c. 767 BC–c. 754 BC King Uzziah of Judah
c. 740 BC–c. 700 BC prophecy of Isaiah
prophecy of Micah
c. 722 BC Kingdom of Israel falls to Neo-Assyrian Empire
c. 715 BC–c. 687 BC King Hezekiah of Judah
prophecy of Joel(?)
prophecy of Nahum
c. 648 BC– c. 609 BC King Josiah of Judah
prophesy of Jeremiah

Before and during Exile
c. 609 BC
King Jehoahaz of Judah 3 Months
c. 608 BC–c. 598 BC
King Jehoiakim of Judah
c. 598 BC–c. 597 BC
King Jeconiah of Judah
c. 597 BC–c. 520 BC 
In Judea: prophecy of Zephaniah, Jeremiah, Obadiah, and Habakkuk
In Babylon: prophecy of Ezekiel

Post Exile
c. 530 BC First view (and traditional one) is that Daniel was written immediately after the Babylonian exile ended and many Jews returned to Jerusalem to rebuild the temple.  Daniel's prophetic visions revealed successive empires that would follow, one after the other as well as providing a backdrop of God's eternal, unshakeable kingdom continuing in spite of the earthly upheaval and power struggles. The scholarly view is that the "prophecy" of Daniel was written in the 2nd Century B.C. during the time of the Seleucid dynasty.  Note that in Jewish scripture, Daniel is not considered a prophet and is not included among the prophetic books.
c. 520 BC–c. 411 BC prophecy of Haggiah, Zechariah, Joel(?)
Return to the land under Persian rule, and writings of Ezra-Nehemiah
Story of Esther
c. 433 BC [?] prophecy of Malachi during the times of the Persian Empire
(535 BC: First portion of Ezra; 515 BC: Second portion of Ezra and Haggai and Zecharia; Joel possibly some time later; 474 BC: Esther; 450 BC: Remainder of Ezra, Nehemiah, and Malachi.)
c. 312 BC–c. 63 BC Judah's subjugation under the Seleucid Empire
During this period Judah became the sovereign nation of Israel: The Maccabean Revolt 167 to 160 BC

References

Prophets
Prophets